Imre Josef Demhardt is a historian of cartography and Garrett professor at the University of Texas at Arlington.

References

Living people
Year of birth missing (living people)
University of Texas at Arlington faculty
21st-century American historians
American male non-fiction writers
American geographers
American cartographers
21st-century American male writers